KSKJ, or Kranjsko slovenska katoliška jednota ("Carniolan Slovene Catholic Union"), is a Slovene fraternal organization in the United States, founded in 1894. It is headquartered in Joliet, Illinois. The English name of the society is the American Slovenian Catholic Union. Membership is open to all Catholic Slovenes. In 1979 it had 42,000 members in 130 lodges in 19 states.

Among the group's activities, it sponsors award and recognition dinners, annual regional and state outdoor activities, contests for children, picnics and Christmas parties. The society also awards scholarships for college and technical schools. Charities of various kinds have been supported by local lodges and the national organization.

The society publishes a newspaper, KSKJ Voice.

See also
Slovenian Americans
Slovene National Benefit Society

References

External links
KSKJ homepage
Slovenian Americans

Slovene-American culture in Illinois
Ethnic fraternal orders in the United States
Organizations established in 1896
Catholic fraternal orders